OAE could refer to:
 Oceanic Anoxic event, in which the Earth's oceans become completely depleted of oxygen below the surface levels.
 Orchestra of the Age of Enlightenment, a British period instrument orchestra.
 Otoacoustic emissions, involved in testing hearing.
 Omni Air Express, United States (ICAO operator designator)
 Operation Active Endeavour
 Oddworld: Abe's Exoddus a platform game made by Oddworld Inhabitants released in 1998

See also
Oae (disambiguation)